, often referred to simply as Code Geass, is a Japanese anime television series produced by Sunrise. It was directed by Gorō Taniguchi and written by Ichirō Ōkouchi, with original character designs by Clamp. Set in an alternate timeline, it follows the exiled prince Lelouch vi Britannia, who obtains the "power of absolute obedience" from a mysterious woman named C.C. Using this supernatural power, known as Geass, he leads a rebellion against the rule of the Holy Britannian Empire, commanding a series of mecha battles.

Code Geass was broadcast in Japan on MBS from October 2006 to July 2007. Its sequel series, Code Geass: Lelouch of the Rebellion R2, ran as a simulcast on MBS and TBS from April to September 2008. The series has also been adapted into various manga and light novels, with the former showing alternate scenarios from the TV series.

Initiation, Transgression, and Glorification, a three-part compilation film recapping the events of both anime series' seasons—while also altering storylines for various characters and establishing an alternate universe—was released between 2017 and 2018. A new original film titled Code Geass Lelouch of the Re;surrection, taking place after the Zero Requiem of the film trilogy's alternate universe, was released in theaters in February 2019. Code Geass: Z of the Recapture, an anime series set in the same alternate universe, was announced in December 2020 as part of a 10-year plan.

Bandai Entertainment licensed most parts of the franchise for English release in December 2007, airing the series English dubbed on Adult Swim in the United States. Most manga and light novels have also been published in North America by Bandai.

Code Geass has been well received in Japan, selling over a million DVD and Blu-ray Discs. Both seasons have won several awards at the Tokyo International Anime Fair, Animage Anime Grand Prix, and Animation Kobe event. It received critical acclaim for its story, voice acting, large audience appeal, the conflicts among its main characters, and the moral questions it presented.

Synopsis

Setting
 
In an alternative timeline, the world is divided into three superpowers (similar to the world of Nineteen Eighty-Four by George Orwell): the Holy Britannian Empire (the Americas; also called Britannia), the Chinese Federation (Asia), and the Europa United (Europe and Africa). The story takes place after the Holy Britannian Empire's conquest of Japan on August 10, 2010 a.t.b., by means of Britannia's newest weapon, the "Autonomous Armored Knight", or "Knightmare Frame". In turn, Britannia effectively strips Japan and its citizens of all rights and freedoms and renames the country Area 11 with its citizens referred to as Elevens.

The point of divergence for this timeline appears to be that King Henry VIII of England had a male heir who became King Henry IX. Later, England, led by Queen Elizabeth III, was defeated by Napoleon at the Battle of Trafalgar. The queen fled to Britain's North American colonies where the Britannian Empire was established.

Plot
Lelouch vi Britannia is an exiled Britannian prince, son of Emperor Charles zi Britannia and his royal consort Marianne vi Britannia. Lelouch has a sister, Nunnally vi Britannia. Marianne was brutally murdered in the palace and Nunnally, who witnessed the murder of their mother, was so traumatized she lost both her sight and ability to walk. Lelouch is furious with his father, believing his father failed his mother and sister by turning a blind eye to their mother's death and failing to pursue their mother's killer.

Lelouch and Nunnally are sent as political pawns to Japan to lull the Japanese government into a false sense of security. After the siblings are sent to Japan, Japan is attacked and defeated by Britannia. With the ruins of Japan as a background, Lelouch vows to his Japanese friend Suzaku Kururugi that he will one day obliterate Britannia as an act of vengeance against his father.

Seven years later, Lelouch (now going by the name Lelouch Lamperouge), is now a popular yet withdrawn student at Ashford Academy. This power can affect an individual just once and only through direct eye contact. Lelouch decides to use his Geass to find his mother's murderers, destroy the Britannian Empire, and create a better world where Nunnally can live happily. In the process, Lelouch becomes Zero, a masked vigilante and the leader of the resistance movement known as The Black Knights, gaining popularity and support among the Japanese on his way towards the rebellion of Britannia. However, this does not come without a cost. Caught up in a conflict where he does not know the full extent of his powers, Lelouch will have to battle Suzaku, a resistance member named Kallen Stadtfeld, the strongest army in the world, his own half-siblings, and many others in a battle that will forever change the world.

Production
Code Geass began as a concept developed at Sunrise by Ichirō Ōkouchi and Gorō Taniguchi, who proposed it to producer Yoshitaka Kawaguchi. Kawaguchi had previously approached Okouchi and Taniguchi during the production of Planetes. The basic idea for the plot consisted of a "hero" who led a secret organization, which was later developed into a conflict between two characters with different values and who belonged to the same military unit, who eventually became Lelouch Lamperouge and Suzaku Kururugi.

During these initial planning stages, Kawaguchi also contacted the noted manga artist group Clamp. This was the first time Clamp had ever been requested to design the characters of an anime series. Clamp signed onto the project early during these development stages and provided numerous ideas, which helped develop the series' setting and characters.

While developing the character designs for Lelouch, the protagonist of the series, Clamp had originally conceived of his hair color as being white. Ageha Ohkawa, head writer at Clamp, said she had visualized him as being a character to which "everyone" could relate to as being "cool", literally, a "beauty". During these planning stages, Clamp and the Sunrise staff had discussed a number of possible inspirations for the characters, including KinKi Kids and Tackey & Tsubasa. They had wanted to create a "hit show," a series which would appeal to "everyone." Lelouch's alter ego, Zero, was one of the earliest developed characters, with Ōkouchi having wanted a mask to be included as a part of the series, feeling it was necessary for it to be a Sunrise show, and Clamp wanting a unique design never prior seen in any Sunrise series (said mask was nicknamed "tulip" for its distinctive design).

The concept for the Geass may have been inspired by the Irish and Welsh legends of "Geas" or "Geis". A geas is a compulsion laid on someone to do or not do something. While the geas itself does not lie on any spectrum, the benefits or actions of it may be decidedly benevolent or malevolent. The concept fits in into the wider fictional world and its lore of British inspirations.

Clamp's finalized original character design art, illustrated by its lead artist Mokona, was subsequently converted into animation character designs for the series by Sunrise's character designer Takahiro Kimura, who had previously spent "every day" analyzing Clamp's art and style from their artbooks and manga series. In working on the animation character designs, he focused on designing them so as to enable the series' other animators to apply them without deviating from Clamp's original art style.

The music for the series was composed by Kōtarō Nakagawa and Hitomi Kuroishi, who had earlier worked with the series' core staff in Planetes and Taniguchi's earlier work Gun X Sword. In addition to the incidental music featured in each episode, Kuroishi also composed numerous insert songs for the series, including "Stories", "Masquerade", "Alone", and "Innocent Days", which were each performed by Kuroishi herself, while "Picaresque" and "Callin'" were performed by the singer-songwriter Mikio Sakai, who had also earlier worked with Nakagawa and Kuroishi in Planetes. The bands FLOW, Ali Project, Jinn, SunSet Swish, Access, and Orange Range have provided songs for the opening and ending themes.

When the series was being developed for broadcast on MBS TV, it had been given the network's Saturday evening prime time slot, which was later changed to a Thursday late night time slot. Due to this change, the overall outlook and some elements of the series were changed and further developed to suit the more mature, late night audience. The supernatural "Geass" ability finally came into the show at this point and was first conceived as a special power granted by an "angel" to the main characters, though this last part was also modified.

Media

Anime

Code Geass officially premiered on the Mainichi Broadcasting System (MBS) television station on October 5, 2006 (01:25 JST on October 6, 2006). Its satellite television premiere across Japan on Animax was on November 7, 2006. Upon the airing of the first 23 episodes, the series went on hiatus on March 29, 2007, and completed broadcast of the first series with a contiguous one-hour broadcast of episodes 24 and 25 on Saturday, July 28, 2007.

The immense popularity of Code Geass: Lelouch of the Rebellion followed with the development of its sequel, which was first announced on the March 2007 issue of Newtype and later confirmed by Sunrise producer Yoshitaka Kawaguchi on the series' official staff blog on March 9, 2007.

Code Geass: Lelouch of the Rebellion R2 premiered on all Japan News Network (JNN) member stations (like MBS and TBS) on April 6, 2008, in the primetime anime timeslot, with the timeslot changing from 18:00 JST on Saturdays to 17:00 JST on Sundays. Prior to the series' television broadcast, three private preview screenings of episode 1 were held on March 15 and March 16 in Osaka and Tokyo respectively, which was attended by the series' Japanese voice actors as well as a pool of 3800 randomly selected applicants. On April 15, 2008, at 17:00 JST, the last 6 minutes of the then unaired third episode was accidentally posted onto the Internet due to an error by Bandai Channel, Bandai's online broadcast channel and the series online distributor, in the midst of testing a system preventing illegal online uploads.

The  picture drama was based on a live event held in Tokyo, Japan on Lelouch's birthday.

Another OVA anime titled  was announced and revealed through the anime's official website. Takahiro Kimura did the character designs of the series. Makoto Baba was assigned as the director of the OVA while episode scriptwriter Yuuichi Nomura and music composer Kotaro Nakagawa returned for the said project. In the story, Lelouch makes the ultimate use of his Geass for his little sister Nunnally, who loves Alice in Wonderland. The Blu-ray was released by Bandai Visual on July 27, 2012 with English subtitles and bundled with a 40 page picture book.

A 3-part theatrical compilation anime film of the TV anime was released, with the first film titled  released on October 21, 2017. The second film titled  was released February 10, 2018. The film placed 8th at the mini-theater ranking on its opening weekend. The third compilation film, titled  was released in theaters on May 26, 2018. Each film has several changes to the storyline, as Taniguchi stated, to give it more of a "what if" scenarios leading to the new film.

 movie was announced on November 27, 2016. It was released in theaters in Japan on February 9, 2019. It takes place in the alternate continuity established in the recap films and is a sequel to the "Zero Requiem" arc of that continuity.

A new anime television series titled Code Geass: Z of the Recapture was announced on December 5, 2020, Lelouch's birthday.  The new anime project is part of a new 10-year plan for the franchise by Studio Sunrise, with Yoshimitsu Ohashi is directing the series, Noboru Kimura writing the scripts, and Takahiro Kimura returning to design the characters.  In celebration of the new anime, the Code Geass Lelouch of the Re;surrection movie was re-released in 4D in Japanese theaters on January 29, 2021.

Akito the Exiled

The new Code Geass series  was first revealed on December 5, 2009. In April 2010, it was officially revealed that a new Code Geass side story anime called  would be directed by Kazuki Akane (The Vision of Escaflowne). The side story is an OVA series set in Europe during the Britannian invasion of the continent between Lelouch of the Rebellions two seasons. Originally intended to be released in four chapters, production of a fifth Akito the Exiled episode was announced after the Japanese debut of the third entry on May 2, 2015. Along with the two seasons of the television series, the OVAs are licensed by Funimation. In January 2016, Manga Entertainment, who licensed the series in the UK, listed that they will release the first two episodes on Blu-Ray with an English dub on December 5, 2016. They later changed the date to April 10, 2017 and as of most recently the release is now scheduled to be on October 1, 2017. Madman Entertainment has also released the first three episodes on DVD.  Funimation announced it will release the series in early 2017. On March 15, 2017, Funimation officially announced the pre order and release date, June 27, 2017. The release will be a Blu-ray and DVD Combo pack with both subbed and dubbed audio. The picture drama has been released in only Japan and Italy.

International licensing
Both seasons of Code Geass have been licensed for release in the United States by Bandai Entertainment, and the first season began airing on Cartoon Network's Adult Swim programming block in the U.S. on April 27, 2008; the second began airing on November 2, immediately following the first season. The series finale premiered on June 7, 2009, ending the second season and the rest of the story. On April 23, 2010, Adult Swim's broadcast rights to the series expired.

Following the closure of Bandai Entertainment in 2012, Sunrise announced at their official panel during Otakon 2013 that Funimation has rescued both seasons of Code Geass and in addition licensed Akito the Exiled, along with a handful of other former Bandai Entertainment titles.

In Australia and New Zealand, the series is sub-licensed to Madman Entertainment by Bandai Entertainment USA, and began airing on Australian channel ABC2 from January 19, 2009. As at 2018 it is available on Australian Netflix.

In the Philippines, the first season of Code Geass premiered on November 10, 2008, weekday nights at 7:30pm PST and ended on December 15, 2008 through TV5, while season 2 premiered on May 4, 2009 and ended on June 5, 2009, weekday nights at 6:00pm PST with a weekend afternoon recap of the week's episodes also on TV5. Despite the poor ratings it attained due to competition with local TV newscasts and prime time soaps, the series was able to gain a huge following and became one of the most talked-about anime series in the country during its run. Code Geass had its Philippine cable premiere on July 27, 2010 through Hero TV.

In Italy, the first season aired from September 23, 2009 to February 25, 2010 on Rai 4, while season 2 was broadcast on Rai 4 from March 4, 2010 to August 12, 2010; both seasons were broadcast at about 11:10 pm.

Sunrise announced at its Anime Boston panel on Friday that Funimation licensed the remake film trilogy.

Funimation announced that they licensed the Code Geass Lelouch of the Re;surrection film for its North American theatrical release in May 2019.

Manga

Kadokawa Shoten has published four separate manga adaptations, each containing an alternate storyline. The first four of the manga series have been licensed for an English language release in North America by Bandai Entertainment. The first, Code Geass: Lelouch of the Rebellion, by Majiko~! and originally serialized Monthly Asuka, focused on the protagonist of the series, Lelouch Lamperouge, with few differences from the anime's basic storyline. The most noticeable difference from the anime version is the absence of the Knightmare frames. Its chapters were collected in eight tankōbon volumes released from December 26, 2008 to March 26, 2010. Bandai's English adaptation of the series was published from July 29, 2008 to February 15, 2011.

It was written by Atsuro Yomino and serialized in Beans A magazine. It focuses on the character Suzaku Kururugi in an alternate reality, where he fights against the criminal organization known as the Black Knights. While initially bearing a strong resemblance to its source, the manga is a tokusatsu show where the Lancelot mecha is now a bodysuit which Suzaku wears (the suit makes a cameo appearance as a costume in the 21st episode of the first season of the anime); further, the characters of Cecile Croomy and Euphemia li Britannia are composited as Mariel Lubie. It was released in two volumes on June 26, 2007 and September 26, 2008. The first English volume was released on January 6, 2009, and the second followed it on October 13, 2009.

, serialized in Comp Ace and written by Tomomasa Takuma, focuses on Lelouch's sister, Nunnally Lamperouge who goes into searching her missing brother when her health is restored by an entity named Nemo. It was published in five volumes from June 26, 2007 to April 25, 2009. The English volumes were published from June 9, 2009 to March 23, 2010.

A fourth manga adaptation, was serialized in Kerokero Ace. Set in an alternate 1853, Lelouch is the commander of the Shogunate's military counterinsurgence brigade known as the Shinsengumi, which fights the Black Revolutionaries, a rebel group led by a masked individual known as Rei. It was released on a single volume on October 25, 2010, while the English version was published on May 10, 2011.

In late 2009, Bandai announced a new project greenlit for 2010. A manga, titled , was the first product announced. The story takes place in the same official Code Geass history as the anime, but in a different era with the anime director Goro Taniguchi scripting the story. The title character, Renya, is a 17-year-old boy who encounters a mysterious, perpetually young witch named "Reifū C.C.", who has appeared in Japan's historical Edo era to seek a new partner for a covenant. It began publication in the May 2010 issue of Shōnen Ace. Bandai Entertainment announced that it will publish the manga in English as with the other adaptions. On January 2, 2012 as a part of Bandai Entertainment's announced restructuring, they have since, among other titles, revoked publishing of Code Geass: Renya of Darkness for English release.

The spinoff  takes place between the first and second seasons of the anime television and is told from two perspectives. The photo story in Hobby Japan centers around Orpheus Zevon, a young terrorist with the Knightmare Frame Byakuen who is in pursuit of his lover's killer. The manga in Newtype Ace revolves around Oldrin Zevon, a girl in the Britannia Empire's anti-terrorist unit Glinda Knights who pilots the Knightmare Frame Lancelot Grail. The story of Oz the Reflection and Akito the Exiled takes place at the same time in between season 1 and 2 of the TV series.

Audio CDs
The series has been adapted into a series of drama CDs, called Sound Episodes, the first of which was released in Japan in April 2007 by Victor Entertainment, with new volumes released monthly. Written by many of the same writers as the series, these episodes are set between episodes and feature theme songs performed by the series' voice actors. They have also been available online on a limited streaming basis on the Japanese internet website Biglobe.

In total, twelve drama CDs have been released. The first six, released between April 25, 2007 and September 27, 2007 cover the first season of the series, and the other six focusing on the second season.

Soundtrack

The music for the series, composed by Kōtarō Nakagawa and Hitomi Kuroishi, has been released across two original soundtracks produced by Yoshimoto Ishikawa and released by Victor Entertainment. The first was released in Japan on December 20, 2006, and the second on March 24, 2007. The covers and jackets for both soundtracks were illustrated by Takahiro Kimura.

Light novels

Code Geass ('Code Geass') has been additionally novelized into a series of light novels. First serialized in Kadokawa Shoten's The Sneaker magazine, they are divided into two separate series corresponding with the series two seasons. The first series, Code Geass: Lelouch of the Rebellion, spanned five volumes with the first, labelled as volume 0, released in Japan on April 28, 2007, and the last on March 1, 2008. All five volumes in the first series of novels have been released in English by Bandai Visual. The first volume was released in November 2008 and the last one on February 23, 2010. The first novel acts as a prologue, focusing on how Lelouch befriended Suzaku Kururugi, when the former prince and his sister Nunnally Lamperouge were sent to Japan as political hostages.

The second novel series, Code Geass: Lelouch of the Rebellion R2, covers the second season of the anime series in which Lelouch continues his battle against the Britannian Empire. It was released in four volumes from June 1, 2008 to March 1, 2009. A single volume side story novel,  was released on April 1, 2008 in Japan. It focuses on the life of teenager girl Kallen Stadtfeld who becomes a soldier from the organization the Black Knights under Lelouch's leadership to defeat Britannia. On January 3, 2012, the English publication of the light novel adaptation of R2 had been announced as cancelled as part of Bandai Entertainment's planned restructuring which had been announced the day before.

Video games
The series was also slated to be adapted into a series of video games, developed for the Nintendo DS, PlayStation Portable and PlayStation 2 platforms, which was published by Namco Bandai Games. All three games have been available in only Japanese, although an incomplete unofficial patch for the Nintendo DS game exists on the internet that partially translates the game into English. A release on the Wii platform was cancelled for unknown reasons.

The official website for the first Nintendo DS game launched on July 16, 2007, with the game being released a few months later on October 25.

A second game, titled Code Geass: Lelouch of the Rebellion Lost Colors, was developed for the PlayStation Portable and PlayStation 2, and released in Japan on March 27, 2008. It is a visual novel game which follows a new protagonist named , who suffers from amnesia. He has a Geass ability similar to Lelouch's, but activated by voice.

The third game for the Nintendo DS is a collection of minigames featuring chibi forms of the characters. The player moves along a board through dice rolls, landing on different spots to activate minigames. The minigames are parody-style events with multiple genres. These include helping Jeremiah grow oranges, racing against C.C. and Shirley in swimming, and a sidescrolling beat-em-up featuring Kallen in Guren-like armor.

Code Geass R2 appeared in From Software (Demon's Souls, Armored Core) and Banpresto's  PlayStation 3 exclusive mecha action game Another Century's Episode R, released in Japan in August 2010 and in which both versions of Suzaku's Lancelot, Lelouch's Shinkiro, both versions of Kallen's Guren, and C.C.'s Akatsuki are playable. A fourth installment of the ACE franchise for the PlayStation Portable, Another Century's Episode Portable, included Suzaku's Lancelot Albion and Lelouch/Zero's Shinkiro.

Code Geass characters have appeared as costumes in the Japanese version of the PlayStation 3 game Tales of Graces F. These characters are Zero, Suzaku, C.C. and Kallen. These costumes were never released from the US version for unknown reasons. It was discontinued to download on September 27, 2019.

On December 5, 2020, a new mobile game called Code Geass: Genesic Re;CODE was announced as part of the 10-year plan by Studio Sunrise. Considered a direct sequel, the smartphone game features stories about the main Code Geass characters, including several new characters. It's scheduled for a Spring 2021 release.

Artbooks
Two artbooks featuring illustrations of the series, Code Geass Graphics Zero and Code Geass Graphics Ashford, have been published in Japan. Coinciding with the release of the second season of Code Geass was the publication of another artbook, Code Geass – Lelouch of the Rebellion illustrations Rebels, which featured 134 art pieces of the first season. Another 95 page artbook titled Code Geass: Lelouch of the Rebellion – The Complete Artbook has also been published. Finally, CLAMP, the well-known manga artist team who did the designs for Code Geass, put out their own artbook, entitled Code Geass x CLAMP: Mutuality.

Internet radio broadcasts
"Code Geass" has also been adapted into a series of weekly internet radio broadcasts, which were streamed online on the BEAT☆Net Radio! portal, the first of which, began streaming from October 6, 2006. It featured Sayaka Ohara (voice actor of Milly Ashford) and Satomi Arai (voice actor of Sayoko Shinazaki). The second, was first streamed on December 12, 2006, and were hosted by Jun Fukuyama (voice actor of Lelouch) and Noriaki Sugiyama (voice actor of Rivalz).  During R2, a new show named  was streamed, hosted by Fukuyama and Takahiro Sakurai (voice actor of Suzaku).

Reception

Critical response
Code Geass has achieved great success and earned critical acclaim since its release. Anime News Network's columnist Todd Ciolek attributes the soaring popularity of Code Geass to "the series hitting every important fan sector", with the audience appeal points ranging from a "complex cast of characters and a fast-paced story, told with Goro Taniguchi's capable direction" for "general-interest fans" to "pretty and just-a-little-broken heroes" for "yaoi-buying female fans". Carl Kimlinger also finds that the series "has the skill and energy to carry viewers over the top with it, where they can spend a pleasurable few hours reveling in its melodramatic charms." He also adds that Taniguchi "executes the excesses of his series with care, skillfully intercutting events as Lelouch's plans come together (or fall apart) and using kinetic mecha combat".

T.H.E.M. Anime Reviews reviewer Dallas Marshall gave the series 4 out of 5 stars, stating, "a melodramatic piece of science fiction that has more than enough going for it in terms of action and visuals but tends to go overboard with its emotionalism. If this minor flaw can be overlooked, there is an epic story to be told with a rather intriguing main character at the helm. Take away one star if that minor 'flaw' cannot be ignored."

A less favorable review was given by Carlo Santos of Anime News Network, who gave it an overall "C" and wrote that the franchise "in a way, [...] reflects the malaise of a generation: the realization that old, rich, powerful people have screwed up the world and that the young are helpless to do anything about it". According to him, Lelouch's actions exemplify the wish to see problems like "economic collapse, class conflict, political instability, radical extremism" solved by "Zero's vigilante methods" but Santos expresses doubt in such an approach and concludes that "the series is at its best when raising questions rather than offering a final solution" (the review is focused on the manga adaptation of the story, which has certain differences compared with the original anime).

Home video sales
When the first episode was shown during a special test screening, which was attended by Ōkawa, other members of the series' staff, as well as several journalists and other media-related personnel in response to the hype surrounding the series' upcoming release, the audience fell into immediate silence after it ended, followed by "tremendous applause." By August 2008, over 900,000 Code Geass discs had been sold in Japan.

Reportedly, Bandai Visual shipped over one million DVD and Blu-ray Discs related to the Code Geass franchise by November 2008, placing it among the most popular contemporary anime series in both Japan and North America. During 2008, the first volume from R2 was the fourth bestselling anime DVD and Blu-ray Disc in Japan according to Amazon.com.

Box office
Episodes 1, 3 and 5 of Akito the Exiled were screened theatrically in Japan between 2012 and 2016, with episode 1 grossing ¥35,112,097 in 2012, and episodes 3 and 5 grossing ¥216,957,460 during 20152016. Combined, the three episodes grossed ¥252,069,557 at the Japanese box office.

During 2017–2018, Code Geass launched three theatrical recap movies in Japan (October 21, February 10, and May 26 respectively), across 79 Theaters. The first part, The Awakening Path, grossed ¥67,954,086.40 opening night, rising to number #8 on the charts. The Rebellion Path grossed ¥57,241,203.20 during its opening premiere, ranking #7 on the charts. The Imperial Path grossed ¥67,864,834,800 on its opening day, and debuted at #8 on the charts. Combined, the film trilogy grossed ¥647,802,700 in Japan.

Accolades
Since its premiere, Code Geass: Lelouch of the Rebellion has collected numerous awards and accolades. At the sixth annual Tokyo Anime Awards held at the 2007 Tokyo International Anime Fair, Code Geass won the best anime television series award. The second season also got the award of "Best Screenplay" in the 2009 Tokyo Anime Fair. In noted Japanese anime magazine Animages 29th Annual Anime Grand Prix, Code Geass won the most popular series award, with Lelouch Lamperouge also being chosen as the most popular male character and "Colors" being chosen as the most popular song. In the 30th Annual Anime Grand Prix, Lelouch won first place again and C.C. was voted most popular female character. At the first Seiyu Awards held in 2007, Jun Fukuyama won the award for best voice actor in a leading role for his performance as Lelouch Lamperouge in the series, while Ami Koshimizu won the award for best voice actress in a supporting role for her performance as Kallen Stadtfeld.

Furthermore, Code Geass won the award for Best TV Animation at the twelfth Animation Kobe event, held annually in Kobe, Hyōgo Prefecture, with R2 taking the award in the following year. In the 2009, Seiun Award, Code Geass R2 was a nominee in the category "Best Media Award".

Notes

References

External links

 Biglobe's Code Geass portal site 
 MBS's official site 
 Sunrise's official site 
 

 
2006 anime television series debuts
2006 manga
2007 Japanese novels
2007 manga
2008 Japanese novels
2008 anime television series debuts
2008 video games
2009 anime OVAs
2010 manga
2012 anime OVAs
Alternate history anime
Anime with original screenplays
Bandai Entertainment anime titles
Bandai Entertainment manga titles
Bandai Namco franchises
Bandai Visual
Cyborgs in anime and manga
Discrimination in fiction
Fiction about curses
Fiction about mind control
Fiction about regicide
Funimation
Fiction about government
Japan-exclusive video games
Kadokawa Shoten manga
Kadokawa Sneaker Bunko
Light novels
Mainichi Broadcasting System original programming
Mecha anime and manga
Medialink
Military anime and manga
Monarchy in fiction
PlayStation 2 games
PlayStation Portable games
Propaganda in fiction
Fiction about rebellions
Anime and manga about revenge
Seinen manga
Shōjo manga
Shōnen manga
Sororicide in fiction
Sunrise (company)
Television series about World War III
Television series set in 2017
Television series set in the 2010s
Television shows written by Ichirō Ōkouchi
Terrorism in fiction
Video games developed in Japan
Visual novels
Works banned in China
Works by Clamp (manga artists)
World War III video games